ITK may stand for:

 ITK (gene), a mammalian gene encoding IL2-inducible T-cell kinase
 Itk, ( IncrTk), a programming language
 Innovation TK Ltd
 Insight Segmentation and Registration Toolkit, an extensible open source image software library
 Kalimantan Institute of Technology (Institut Teknologi Kalimantan), a university in Balikpapan, Indonesia
 Inuit Tapiriit Kanatami, a Canadian organisation representing Inuit